Saint Gordianus may refer to:

 Saint Gordianus (died 362), commemorated 10 May, Roman martyr
 Saint Gordianus (commemorated 17 September), who suffered martyrdom (place uncertain) with two companions
 Saint Gordianus (commemorated 13 September), who with several companions was martyred in Pontus or Galatia